Clunderwen railway station serves the village of Clynderwen in Pembrokeshire, Wales. The station is unmanned. It is a request stop.

History

The station was renamed Clynderwen on 1 December 1875, being named after the Clynderwen Estate, which included property in the area around the station; a previous suggestion to use the parish name Llandisilio was rejected. The Narberth Road and Maenclochog Railway (NR&MR) opened in 1876, the junction of that line being to the west of Clynderwen station; and the NR&MR trains to  used a bay at the eastern end of the up side of the station.

There have been several subsequent amendments to the station's name: to Clynderwen Halt on 6 September 1965; reverting to Clynderwen on 5 May 1969; and finally becoming Clunderwen on 12 May 1980.

Services
InterCity 125 services ran through Clunderwen to Milford Haven until the early 1990s, terminating in 1994.

Trains that stop here go to Milford Haven westbound and to Swansea, Cardiff Central, Crewe and Manchester Piccadilly eastbound. A basic two-hourly frequency runs Mon-Sat, with fewer trains on Sundays.

Notes

References

External links 

Clynderwen Station on navigable 1946 O.S. map

Railway stations in Pembrokeshire
DfT Category F2 stations
Former Great Western Railway stations
Railway stations in Great Britain opened in 1854
Railway stations served by Transport for Wales Rail
Railway request stops in Great Britain
1854 establishments in Wales